Quentin S. Crisp (born 1972) is a British writer and publisher of supernatural fiction. Unlike the better-known personality of the same name, this Quentin Crisp was given the name at birth but, being younger, must use his middle initial to disambiguate. Originally from North Devon, Crisp now lives in London. He has a bachelor's degree in Japanese from the University of Durham, has spent two periods living in Japan and Japanese literature is a significant influence in his work.

Crisp is responsible for the Chômu Press, publishing fiction by contemporary authors.

Crisp also writes lyrics, which have been recorded by Kodagain.

His novella Shrike was a 2009 Shirley Jackson Award finalist.

Bibliography
The Nightmare Exhibition, BJM Press (Chesterfield), 2001 (short stories)
Morbid Tales, Tartarus Press (Carlton-in-Coverdale), 2004 (short stories)
Rule Dementia, Rainfall Books (Calne, Wilts), 2005; republished by Snuggly Books, 2016 (short stories)
Shrike, PS Publishing (Hornsea, UK), 2009 (novella)
"Remember You're a One-Ball!", Chômu Press, 2010 (novel)
All God's Angels, Beware!, Ex Occidente Press (Bucharest, Romania) 2009; republished by Chômu Press in 2012 (short stories)
Defeated Dogs, Eibonvale Press, 2013 (short stories)
The Cutest Girl in Class, Snuggly Books, 2013 (a novel written in collaboration with authors Justin Isis and Brendan Connell)
The Boy Who Played with Shadows, L'Homme Récent (Bucharest, Romania), 2015 (memoir; limited to 85 copies)
Erith, Zagava (Düsseldorf, Germany), 2015 (novella; limited to 100 copies)
Blue on Blue, Snuggly Books, 2015 (novel)
The Paris Notebooks, Snuggly Books, 2017 (memoir)
Aiaigasa, Snuggly Books, 2018 (memoir)
Graves, Snuggly Books, 2019 (novel)
The Flowering Hedgerow, Snuggly Books, 2020 (memoir)

References

External links
 Crisp's blog
 Chomu Press website
 

1972 births
Living people
Alumni of Durham University